Radhanath may refer to:

Radhanath Ray (1848–1908), Oriya poet
Radhanath Sikdar (1813–1870), mathematician
Radhanath Swami (born 1950), guru

Indian masculine given names